Reel People is a 1984 pornographic film directed by Anthony Spinelli. It was a seminal film as it was the first major movie to feature sex between professional pornographic performers and amateurs, ushering in "Pro-Am Porn", which became a porn genre. It is also a precursor of the reality porn genre. It was inducted into the XRCO Hall of Fame in 2008.

The professional performers in the film include John Leslie, Richard Pacheco, Paul Thomas, and Aunt Peg.

Cast
 Richard Pacheco as himself
 John Leslie as himself
 Paul Thomas as himself
 Juliet Anderson as herself (as Juliette Anderson)
 Gail Sterling as herself (as Gayle Sterling)

References

External links
 
 Anthony Spinelli's Reel People- a Landmark Porn Film from Arrow Productions; a review

1984 films
1980s pornographic films
American pornographic films
1980s English-language films
1980s American films